James Clay Roe (January 7, 1904 – April 4, 1956), nicknamed "Shad", was a Major League Baseball pitcher. He batted and threw left-handed.

He was born in Greenbrier, Tennessee and died in Cleveland, Mississippi.

External links
Baseball-Reference.com

Washington Senators (1901–1960) players
1904 births
1956 deaths
Baseball players from Mississippi
People from Greenbrier, Tennessee